In the mathematical field of graph theory, the Loupekine snarks are two snarks, both with 22 vertices and 33 edges.

The first Loupekine snark  graph can be described as follows (using the SageMath's syntax):

 lou1 = Graph({1:[2,3,4],
 5:[6,10],6:[7],7:[8],8:[9],9:[10],
 11:[16,12],12:[13],13:[14],14:[15],15:[16],
 17:[2,5,16],18:[2,10,11], 19:[3,7,12],20:[3,6,13], 21:[9,4,14],22:[4,8,15]}).

The second Loupekine snark is obtained (up to an isomorphism) by replacing edges 5–6 and 11–12 by edges 5–12 and 6–11 in the first graph.

Properties 

Both snarks share the same invariants (as given in the boxes). The set of all the automorphisms of a graph is a group for the composition. For both Loupekine snarks, this group is the dihedral group  (identified as [12,4] in the Small Groups Database).
1
2,3,4
17, 18, 19, 20, 21, 22
5, 6, 7, 8, 9, 10, 11, 12, 13, 14, 15, 16

The characteristic polynomials are different, namely:

 
and

References

Individual graphs